Maureen Bruno Roy is a United States cyclocross and mountain bike racer. She has competed in 2 UCI Cyclocross World Championships on the US National Team. She has been a four time US National Cyclocross champion in both the single speed and masters division, and has earned a bronze medal in the elite field. She won the single speed cyclocross World Championship in Louisville KY in 2014. Bruno Roy announced her retirement from professional racing in 2015.

References

Living people
Year of birth missing (living people)